Mozang Epang (d. 1061) was an ethnic Tangut statesman and chancellor of the Western Xia dynasty of China during the reign of the Emperor Jingzong and Emperor Yizong.

Life

Family background 
Mozang Epang was a member of the Tangut prominent Mozang clan. Due to marriages of his female family members, Epang was closely related to the ruling Weiming (Li) clan.

Younger sister: Empress Xuanmu Huiwen (宣穆惠文皇后; d.1056), wife of the Emperor Jingzong of Western Xia

Daughter: Empress Mozang, wife of the Emperor Yizong of Western Xia.

Reign of the Emperor Jingzong 
The exact date of birth of Mozang Epang is not known. Mozang Epang rose to power during the Tianshoulifayanzuo era (天授理法延祚).  When Crown Prince Ningming died of illness, Mozang Epang presented the candidature of Prince Ningling Ge (寧令哥 or 寧林格, lit. "Grand Prince Ge") as the heir apparent. In 1046, Mozang Epang was bestowed a title of Great Advisor (大師), which was equivalent to Prime Minister. In 1047,  Empress Xiancheng, lady Yeli, was demoted to a commoner and turned to nunnery due to machinations of lady Mozang, who had framed Lady Yeli for a romance with the official Buxiqi Duosi (补細乞多巳). This strengthened the relationship between lady Mozang and Emperor Jingzong. On 5 March 1047, Empress Xuanmuhuiwen gave birth to Ninglingliangcha (Li Liangzuo), the future Emperor Yizong.

In 1048, Emperor Jingzong seduced Crown Princess, lady Meiyi (沒移氏) and conferred upon her a title of Empress. Ningling Ge's mother and Epang instructed Ningling Ge to kill the emperor so as support his later ascension to the throne  On 19 January 1048, Ningling Ge broke down into the chamber of Li Yuanhao, seizing the opportunity of the drunken state of his father. The only action Ningling Ge manage to undertake was chopping out Yuanhao's nose. Ningling Ge went for backup to Mozang Epang because of being  frightened of his murder. Epang betrayed his accomplice by turning him an assassin, which led to the execution of the crown prince. Li Yuanhao was able to survive an attempt of assassination, but succumbed of his wounds.

Reign of the Emperor Yizong 
After Ningling Ge had been executed, Mozang Epang supported the ascension of his nephew, Liangzuo, to the imperial throne. At that time Liangzuo was one year old, therefore was raised by Empress Dowager and Epang. Epang and his sister took the reins of regency over the underage emperor.Mozang Epang still wielded an immense authority in the Western Xia imperial court.

In 1056, his sister went to the hunt in Helan Mountains together with her lover, Buxiqi Duosi. During the hunt, dying lady Mozang was brought to the capital by the servants of Li Shougui (李守貴), her first love and subordinate of Yeli Yuqi. Unfortunately, Li Shougui was murdered together with Empress Dowager and Buxiqi Duosi allegedly on Epang's order. When Li Liangzuo reached the maturity age, Mozang Epang forced his daughter into a marriage with the teenage emperor in 1059 and was granted a title of Uncle of the State (國舅). In 1061, Mozang Epang and his daughter plotted to harm the emperor. When the attempt to harm Liangzuo fell through, both Epang and Empress Dowager Mozang were killed on the ground of treason and collusion with Khitan-led Liao dynasty. After their death, Mozang clan was totally extermined.

Legacy 
Mozang Epang has been known as the eminent official of the Western Xia dynasty. Although he was partially responsible for the deaths of imperial clan members, he endeavoured to bring prosperity to the Western Xia. During the reign of emperors Jingzong and Yizong, the Western Xia was one of the most powerful states in the region.

References 

Western Xia people
11th-century Tangut people
Tangut officials
Year of birth missing
1061 deaths
Executed Western Xia people